Thomas Alder (born 9 September 1970) is a Swiss former professional footballer who played as a goalkeeper.

Career
In 1992, Alder signed for Swiss third division side FC Gossau. In 1996, he signed for St. Gallen in the Swiss top flight, where he made 24 appearances. On 14 April 1997, Alder debuted for St. Gallen during a 8–0 loss to Grasshoppers. In 2001, he signed for Costa Rican club Carmelita.

References

External links
 

Living people
1970 births
Swiss men's footballers
Association football goalkeepers
Swiss Super League players
FC Gossau players
FC Wil players
SC Brühl players
FC St. Gallen players
A.D. Carmelita footballers
Swiss expatriate footballers
Swiss expatriate sportspeople in Costa Rica
Expatriate footballers in Costa Rica